Warrensburg is the name of some places in the United States:

 Warrensburg, Illinois
 Warrensburg, Missouri
 Warrensburg (town), New York
 Warrensburg (CDP), New York